The webgraph describes the directed links between pages of the World Wide Web. A graph, in general, consists of several vertices, some pairs  connected by edges. In a directed graph, edges are directed lines or arcs. The webgraph is a directed graph, whose vertices correspond to the pages of the WWW, and a directed edge connects page X to page Y if there exists a hyperlink on page X, referring to page Y.

Properties 

 The degree distribution of the webgraph strongly differs from the degree distribution of the classical random graph model, the Erdős–Rényi model: in the Erdős–Rényi model, there are very few large degree nodes, relative to the webgraph's degree distribution. The precise distribution is unclear, however: it is relatively well described by a lognormal distribution, as well as the Barabási–Albert model for power laws.
 The webgraph is an example of a scale-free network.

Applications 

The webgraph is used for:
 computing the PageRank of the WWW-pages;
 computing the personalized PageRank;
 detecting webpages of similar topics, through graph-theoretical properties only, like co-citation;
 and identifying hubs and authorities in the web for HITS algorithm.

References

External links 
 Webgraphs in Yahoo Sandbox
 Webgraphs at University of Milano – Laboratory for Web Algorithmics
 Webgraphs at Stanford – SNAP
 Webgraph at the Erdős Webgraph Server
 Web Data Commons - Hyperlink Graph

Internet search algorithms
Application-specific graphs